Hydrocortamate (brand names Magnacort, Ulcortis) is a synthetic glucocorticoid with anti-inflammatory and immunosuppressive properties. It is used topically to treat inflammation due to corticosteroid-responsive dermatoses.

References

Corticosteroid esters
Glucocorticoids
Diethylamino compounds